Shop Street is the main thoroughfare of the city of Galway in the west of Ireland. It has been pedestrianised since the late 20th century.

As its name suggests, it is Galway's main shopping street, and was one of the first streets in the city to develop a retail focus. Shop Street contains a number of old brick buildings, bright storefronts, and numerous pubs. The street name "Shop Street" is common in the Connacht region, being found in Boyle, Tuam and Westport as well as Galway. Street performers and buskers are prevalent on the street.

Shop Street contains one of central Galway's best preserved ancient buildings, Lynch's Castle. This 16th century building was converted into a branch of Allied Irish Banks during the 1960s.

Book stores on Shop Street include Dubray Books and Eason & Son, with Charlie Byrne's Bookshop on nearby Middle Street.

As of late 2017, additional improvements and pedestrianisation works were proposed for Shop Street and the surrounding area.

References

External links
 

Geography of Galway (city)
Roads in County Galway
Shopping districts and streets in Ireland
Tourist attractions in Galway (city)